Wallace Dao-kui Loh (born 1946) is a Peruvian/American university administrator. He was the president of the University of Maryland, College Park, from 2010 until 2020.

Early life
Loh was born in Shanghai to a prominent family. His grandparents owned five blocks' worth of downtown Shanghai property, and his father was a diplomat. In 1949, when Mao Zedong took over China after the Communist Revolution, the Loh family sought asylum in Lima, Peru. He went to the United States for college, earning a bachelor's degree from Grinnell College. He later earned a master's degree from Cornell where he was elected for membership in the Telluride House, a Ph.D. degree in psychology from the University of Michigan, and a J.D. degree from Yale Law School.

Academic career

Before becoming the president at University of Maryland, College Park, Loh spent three decades in higher education. He has been dean of the University of Washington Law School, vice chancellor of the University of Colorado, a dean at Seattle University, and most recently provost at the University of Iowa where he oversaw budgets and personnel for the state university's eleven colleges.

During his career in academic administration, Loh has led campaigns to curb underage drinking at University of Iowa, and more recently, to diversify the University of Washington Law School.

During his time as president, the university saw a 13.8% increase in underrepresented minority graduation rates and a decrease in the gap between white and underrepresented minority students of 6.1%. He wrote an editorial in Time magazine discussing the importance of an open dialogue on cultural differences between the student population. He also participated in the planning and development of a memorial square to Frederick Douglass to honor his contributions to 
America's quest for freedom, liberty, and equal rights.

Loh was inducted into Omicron Delta Kappa as a faculty/staff initiate at the University of Maryland in 2011.

In 2018, he endured a personnel scandal related to the death of a football player, Jordan McNair. Loh announced on October 30, 2018, that he would retire as president of the University of Maryland on June 30, 2019, following a detailed investigation into McNair's death. The following day, October 31, Loh fired D. J. Durkin against the desire of the University's Board of Regents, which voted to retain Durkin as head football coach.

On January 30, 2019, Loh moved his retirement date from June 2019 to June 2020 due to the university's lack of a ready replacement.

Awards and memberships
Fellow of the American Academy of Arts and Sciences
Board of directors of American Council of Education
Advisory Board of Comptroller General of the United States
Recipient of American Immigration Council's 16th annual Immigrant Achievement Award

References

External links
 Biography at University of Maryland, College Park

Presidents of the University of Maryland, College Park
Educators from Shanghai
Grinnell College alumni
Living people
People from Lima
Yale Law School alumni
Cornell University alumni
University of Michigan College of Literature, Science, and the Arts alumni
1946 births
Members of Committee of 100
Peruvian emigrants to the United States
Chinese emigrants to the United States
University of Washington School of Law faculty
Deans of law schools in the United States
Seattle University faculty
Refugees in the United States
Chinese refugees